Dinostratus (c. 390 – c. 320 BCE) was a Greek mathematician and geometer, and the brother of Menaechmus. He is known for using the quadratrix to solve the problem of squaring the circle.

Life and work 
Dinostratus' chief contribution to mathematics was his solution to the problem of squaring the circle. To solve this problem, Dinostratus made use of the trisectrix of Hippias, for which he proved a special property (Dinostratus' theorem) that allowed him the squaring of the circle. Due to his work the trisectrix later became known as the quadratrix of Dinostratus as well. Although Dinostratus solved the problem of squaring the circle, he did not do so using ruler and compass alone, and so it was clear to the Greeks that his solution violated the foundational principles of their mathematics. Over 2,200 years later Ferdinand von Lindemann would prove that it is impossible to square a circle using straight edge and compass alone.

Citations and footnotes

References

External links 

Ancient Greek mathematicians
Ancient Greek geometers
4th-century BC Greek people
390s BC births
320s BC deaths
4th-century BC mathematicians